Edward Ernest (Ernie) Courtney (January 20, 1875 – February 29, 1920) was a third baseman in Major League Baseball who played for the Boston Beaneaters, Baltimore Orioles, New York Highlanders, Detroit Tigers and Philadelphia Phillies (-). Courtney batted left-handed and threw right-handed. He was	born in Des Moines, Iowa.

Career

In a six-season career, Courtney posted a .245 batting average with five home runs and 200 RBI in 558 games played.

External links
Baseball Almanac
Baseball Library
Baseball Reference

Baltimore Orioles (1901–02) players
Boston Beaneaters players
Detroit Tigers players
New York Highlanders players
Philadelphia Phillies players
Major League Baseball third basemen
Baseball players from Des Moines, Iowa
1875 births
1920 deaths
Watsonville Hayseeds players
Watsonville Gardiners players
San Francisco A's players
Stockton Wasps players
Sacramento Senators players
Buffalo Bisons (minor league) players
Providence Grays (minor league) players
Memphis Turtles players
Burials in New York (state)